This article lists the Mayors of Brčko District since the independence of Bosnia and Herzegovina, the self-governing administrative unit located in the country's north-east.

From 1995 until 2000, the city Brčko was under the temporary authority of Republika Srpska, one of the two entities of Bosnia and Herzegovina, as one of its municipalities. Following the final arbitration award, Brčko District was constituted in 2000 under the direct sovereignty of the state, formally held in condominium by both entities, united based on the boundaries of the pre-war Brčko municipality, with the Mayor having authority over the entire District.

List of mayors

Municipality of Brčko (1990–1992)

Municipality of Brčko (1995–2000)

Brčko District (2000–present)

See also
Brčko
Brčko District
International Supervisor for Brčko

Notes

References

External links
World Statesmen – Brčko

Mayors of places in Bosnia and Herzegovina
Mayors
Lists of mayors